Margaret Wolfe Hungerford, née Hamilton, (27 April 1855 – 24 January 1897), was an Irish novelist whose light romantic fiction was popular throughout the English-speaking world in the late 19th century.

Biography
She was born in County Cork, Ireland on 27 April 1855. Her father was Canon Fitzjohn Stannus Hamilton, rector and vicar-choral at St. Faughnan's cathedral in Rosscarbery.  As a child she enjoyed making up stories, and won prizes for her writing at school. She was educated at Portarlington College.

In 1872, she married Edward Argles, a Dublin solicitor, who died less than six years later. They had three daughters. To support the fatherless family, she wrote her first novel, Phyllis. Soon after its favourable reception, she wrote Molly Bawn, which became her best-known book.

She married Thomas Henry Hungerford, of Cahirmore, in 1882, with whom she had two sons and one daughter. They lived at St. Brenda's, Bandon, County Cork. By contemporary accounts, she enjoyed country life and was an avid gardener. She rarely travelled far from home. She was one of the few women in Victorian times who was both a prolific author and mother of a sizeable family.

She died at Bandon of typhoid fever on 24 January 1897.

Writing

She approached her writing methodically, setting aside three hours every morning for it. The room where she did her writing had neatly organised manuscripts at her desk, surrounded by many reference works, novels, and other books.

Her books were first published anonymously, and later as by "Mrs. Hungerford". In the United States, her books were mostly published under the pen name "The Duchess".  Some of her early books were published by William Tinsley, a major publisher at the time.

Often writing on commission, she wrote many novels, short stories, and newspaper articles. Her books continued selling as fast as she could write them.

Her plots follow the usual conventions of romantic novels of the day. They contain delicate love scenes that were never offensive to the ideals of Victorian morals. Her works are characterised as entertaining and charming, though usually not of great depth. She tends to have little in the way of character development, tending more towards flirtatious dialogue.  She was adept at capturing the tone of her contemporary fashionable society, and sometimes used Irish settings.

Molly Bawn
Hungerford's best-known novel is Molly Bawn (1878) the story of a frivolous, petulant Irish girl, a flirt, who arouses her lover's jealousy and naively ignores social conventions. Mrs. Hungerford and this book are mentioned in chapter 18 of James Joyce's Ulysses:

"...Molly bawn she gave me by Mrs Hungerford on account of the name I don't like books with a Molly in them like that one he brought me about the one from Flanders..."

"Beauty is in the eye of the beholder"
Molly Bawn contains Hungerford's most famous idiom:

"Beauty is in the eye of the beholder".

Works

Phyllis: a Novel, 1877
Molly Bawn, 1878
Airy Fairy Lilian, 1879
Beauty's Daughters, 1880
Mrs. Geoffrey, 1881
Faith and Unfaith, 1881
Portia, or by Passions Rocked, 1882
Loys, Lord Beresford, and other Tales, 1883
Moonshine and Marguerites, 1883
Rossmoyne, 1883
Doris, 1884
The witching hour, and other stories, 1884 (U.S.)
Fortune's wheel, and other stories, 1884
A Week in Killarney, 1884—reissued as Her Week's Amusement, 1886
O Tender Dolores, 1885
Mildred Trevanion, 1885
A Maiden All Forlorn, and other Stories, 1885
In Durance Vile, and Other Stories, 1885
Dick's Sweetheart, 1885 (U.S.)
Green Pastures and Grey Grief, 1885
Lady Branksmere, 1886
A Mental Struggle, 1886
The Haunted Chamber, 1886 (U.S.)
Lady Valworth's Diamonds, 1886
A Modern Circe, 1887
The Duchess, 1887
Undercurrents, 1888
Marvel, 1888
Honourable Mrs. Vereker, 1888
A Life's Remorse, 1889
A Troublesome Girl, 1889
A Born Coquette, 1890
April's Lady, 1890
A Little Rebel, 1890
Her Last Throw, 1890
A Little Irish Girl, and other Stories, 1891
The O'Connors of Ballinahinch, 1892
A Conquering Heroine, 1892
Nor Wife Nor Maid, 1892
Lady Patty, 1892
Nora Creina, 1892
A Mad Prank, 1893
The Red House Mystery, 1893
Lady Verner's Flight, 1893
An Unsatisfactory Lover, 1894
Peter's Wife, 1894
The Hoyden, 1894
The Three Graces, 1895
A Tug of War, 1895
The Professor's Experiment, 1895
Molly Darling and Other Stories, 1895
A Lonely Girl, 1896-- (American title: A Lonely Maid)
A Point of Conscience, 1896
An Anxious Moment, 1897--(Stories)
Lovice, 1897 (posthumous)
The Coming of Chloe, 1897 (posthumous)

References

External links
 Hungerford's entry at Ricorso, the Irish writers' database
 Also at archive.org
 
 
 
 

19th-century Irish writers
19th-century Irish women writers
Irish women novelists
Deaths from typhoid fever
1855 births
1897 deaths
Infectious disease deaths in the Republic of Ireland
People from Bandon, County Cork
19th-century Irish novelists
People from Rosscarbery